WCKT (107.1 FM) is a commercial radio station located in Lehigh Acres, Florida, broadcasting to the Fort Myers, Florida area.  WCKT airs a country music format branded as "Cat Country". WCKT originally signed on in 1976,airing a beautiful music format. In 1979, the format was flipped to Disco, and the call letters were changed to WSWF. In 1985, the format was changed to Album Oriented Rock, and the call letters were changed to WOOJ (Orange Rock 107). In 1988, facing competition from the new and much more powerful WRXK, WOOJ tweaked its format to Classic Rock. The format was flipped to Country as WCKT, in 1989.

In only one ratings period, the new Cat Country beat longtime Southwest Florida country outlet WHEW to become the area's #1 country station.  WCKT programmed a music intensive format up against WHEW's more full service approach.  That lasted for several years until WHEW become WWGR (Gator Country) about the time the Ft. Myers and Naples markets were combined to become one metro.  Since then, WWGR has been the #1 country outlet in the Ft. Myers - Naples market.

During WCKT's history, current owner iHeartMedia, Inc. (formerly Clear Channel Communications) moved the station onto the 100.1 frequency out of Port Charlotte.  Even though the 100.1 frequency is a C1 stronger signal, the northern leaning coverage area didn't put a strong enough signal to fully cover the Naples/Marco Island portion of the metro.  Cat Country was moved back to 107.1 to compete with WWGR, and presumably also to substantially reduce overlap with co-owned WIKX, whose transmitter is in the same county as 100.1's and thus may have stolen audience from what is now WZJZ and vice versa.

Cat Country alumni
"Super" Dave Logan has been with the station from the beginning
Rick McGee (the station's first PD and longtime morning show host)
Record executive Gator Michaels
Barry "The Bear" Smith
Doc Daily 
"Shotgun" Bob Walker (now the PD at WCTK "Cat Country" in Providence)
Jeff "J.R." Reed (Afternoon host)

Mark "The Shark" Wilson (former PD and PM Drive)

Todd Nixon (former PD and PM Drive)

Mike Tyler (PD and PM Drive 2014 - TFN)
Robin Wolf ( mid-days) 1989–1994)(1995-1997)

Kerry Babb (PD, PM drive 1999–2003) on air personality 1992-1994

External links
Official Website

CKT
Country radio stations in the United States
Radio stations established in 1976
1976 establishments in Florida
IHeartMedia radio stations